Now Bahar-e Kordian (also Romanized as Now Bahār-e Kordīān; also known as Now Bahār) is a village in Bakharz Rural District, in the Central District of Bakharz County, Razavi Khorasan Province, Iran. At the 2006 census, its population was 276, in 71 families.

References 

Populated places in Bakharz County